The Thuận An estuary (Vietnamese: Cửa Thuận An, demotic names: cửa Eo, cửa Nộn), is an important estuarine port on the Perfume River in central Vietnam's Thừa Thiên–Huế Province.

References

Landforms of Thừa Thiên Huế province
Wetlands of Vietnam
Estuaries of Asia